Stefan Hansen (born 9 June 1963 in Berlin) is a German entrepreneur.

Business activity
Stefan Hansen became a Managing Partner at Dorland Advertising Agency in 1989. In 1992, Dorland was acquired by the international agency network, Grey. After Dorland went global, Hansen led 19 Dorland offices in 17 European countries between 1995 and 2007 under the umbrella of Grey Global Group/WPP.

In the early 1990s, Dorland took on a pioneering role in liberalising the energy markets with clients such as BEWAG/Vattenfall, EnBW and GASAG and, together with the e-plus service, advanced the development of the mobile communications market. Other clients included Honda, Procter & Gamble, Volvo, BMW Eastern Europe and Lufthansa.

The image campaigns “Not for everybody” and “Du bist so wunderbar Berlin” were created for Bruno Banani and Berliner Pilsner, respectively, under the leadership of the CCO Hendrick Fritz Melle.

In 2014, Stefan Hansen retired from managing the international agency to focus on his own projects. In doing so, he removed Dorland from the Grey/WPP Network and integrated it into his investment company (Private Pier Industries), which he founded in 2011 together with Hendrick Melle of which he is an Executive Director.

The dog food brand Irish Pure, the whiskey brand Grace O'Malley Whiskey and the fashion label Lemanjá were all developed and distributed under the umbrella of Private Pier Industries. Alongside dorland, the promotion agency Promotion For You and the music publisher Neue Rianoni Music is also a part of the group. Due to its close ties to Ireland, the agency has several branches and subsidiaries on Emerald Island.

Stefan Hansen is deputy CEO of the Board of Bauhaus Archive, Berlin, Chairman of the Emanuel Lasker Society, Olympic Commissioner of the German Rugby Association, and he has written several books and publications.

References

Further reading
Stefan Hansen (Publisher), Alexander Schug and Hilmar Sack (Authors): Moments of Consistency. Eine Geschichte der Werbung, Berlin 2004, .
Stefan Hansen and Edzard Reuter: Scharein, Berlin 2006,  
Forster/Hansen/Negele: Emanuel Lasker – Denker Weltenbürger Schachweltmeister, Berlin 2009,

External links
Private Pier Industries
dorland
bauhaus
Lemanjá Fashion

Living people
1963 births
Businesspeople from Berlin